Darlin Zidane Yongwa Ngameni (born 22 September 2000) is a Cameroonian professional footballer who plays as a left-back for French club Lorient and the Cameroon national team.

Career
On 28 February 2019, Yongwa joined Niort from the Cameroonian club EFBC. He made his professional debut with Niort in a 2–2 Ligue 2 tie with AJ Auxerre on 27 July 2019.

On 24 June 2022, Yongwa signed a four-year contract with Lorient.

International career
Yongwa debuted with the Cameroon national team as a late substitute in a friendly 2–0 loss to Uzbekistan on 23 September 2022.

Career statistics

References

External links
 

2000 births
Living people
Footballers from Douala
Cameroonian footballers
Cameroon international footballers
Association football forwards
Chamois Niortais F.C. players
FC Lorient players
Ligue 1 players
Ligue 2 players
Championnat National 3 players
Cameroonian expatriate footballers
Cameroonian expatriate sportspeople in France
Expatriate footballers in France